Miguel Báez may refer to:

 Miguel Odalis Báez (born 1983), Dominican footballer
 Miguel Báez Espuny (born 1930), Spanish bullfighter known as "El Litri"